The Sahiwal Coal Power Project is a coal power plant project located in the province of Punjab in Pakistan by the name of Huaneng Shandong Ruyi (Pakistan) Energy (Limited). It has an installed capacity of 1320 MW. It commenced full operations on 3 July 2017.

Project details

The power plant is Pakistan's first supercritical coal power plant, and consists of two  plants for a combined capacity of 1,320 MW. This is the first phase, and may be followed by a possible second phase which will include two  plants.

Though the plant is now considered to be part of the China Pakistan Economic Corridor (CPEC) which was announced in April 2015, the symbolic ground breaking for the project actually preceded the announcement of CPEC and took place in May 2014, as the government of Punjab in March 2014 invited bids for the construction of two 660MW power plants in order to help alleviate Pakistan's energy shortfalls.

The plant was built by a joint consortium of China's state-owned China Huaneng Group which will own 51% of shares, and the Shandong Ruyi, which will hold 49% of shares. The Government of Pakistan will purchase electricity from the consortium at a tariff of 8.3601 US Cents/kWh. The project was built on a build, operate, transfer basis in which the plant's ownership will be transferred to the Government of Punjab after 30 years of operation.

The project includes the construction of a railway siding from the village of Yusuf Wala to the site for exclusive use of the plant.

The plants each consist of one boiler, steam turbine and generator, and are fueled by sub-bituminous coal which will be offloaded at the project's purpose-built rail terminus. The plants generate a total of 1,320 megawatts of electricity, with a gross efficiency of 42.11%  by the use of a supercritical steam generator operating at temperatures of up to 580 degrees Celsius.

The plant includes an air quality monitoring system(Flue Gas Desulfurization), and an electrostatic precipitator in order to reduce ash and sulfur emissions from the plant. It requires 60,000 cubic meters of water daily for operation, with water being drawn from the Lower Bari Doab Canal. Raw materials for the plant, including cement, sand, wood, and other buildings materials are being sourced from Pakistan, while furniture from the plants is being procured specifically from markets in nearby Sahiwal.

Construction
While symbolic ground breaking for the project took place in May 2014, commencement of actual civil works began on July 31, 2015. The first of the two 660MW plants was put into operation on May 12, 2017, while the second 660MW plant was put into operation on May 24, 2017. An estimated 350 personnel are required to operate the plant, including 200 Pakistani engineers who are to undergo training in China. Approximately 3000 laborers are required for construction of the plant.

Boiler foundations, and the plant's turbine steel structure have been completed, while the 9-storey tall boiler structure, chimneys, and cooling towers are under construction as of May 2016. In order to transport coal, a purpose built railway line will be built from the Pakistan Railway at Yusuf Wala to the power plant itself. From there, the coal is to be transported via the purpose built railway line. In order to assist in coal transportation, Pakistan Railways has signed a $214 million contract for the purchase of 55 diesel electric locomotives from General Electric. Pakistan Railways will also procure a further 20 diesel electric locomotives specifically for coal transport.
In January 2016, the Pakistan Railways signed a $37 million contract with Jinan Railway Vehicles Equipment Company for the supply of 800 hopper wagons which will be used to transport coal to the Sahiwal Coal Power Plant; 580 of these wagons are to be constructed at the Mughalpura railway workshop.

In order to connect the plant to the national electrical grid, a 9.5 kilometer 500 kilovolt single circuit transmission line will be constructed from the site to the Sahiwal Substation.

Coal Source
As with the Pakistan Port Qasim Power Project, most of the coal used for the power plant is imported from Indonesia and South Africa, and is transported by rail from the Port of Karachi and Port Qasim in Pakistan's Sindh Province to the nearby village of Yusuf Wala on Pakistan's existing railway infrastructure.

An estimated 4.48 million tons of coal will be required annually for the plant, based on a calculation of 22 hours of power generation per day. Indonesia is identified as a primary source for its high quality coal, reliable production, and short transit times to Pakistan. Coal from Pakistan's own Thar coalfield was found to contain excessive amounts of sulfur and lime, and was not deemed to be of high enough quality for the project. The supply of reliable coal from the fields was also considered to be inadequate. A mixture of Pakistani indigenous coal with imported coal was also deemed to be unsuitable as it would decrease heat production from coal, and would compromise safety of the boilers which are to be used in the project.

Financing
The project is expected to cost a total of $1.8 billion. Of this, the Chinese consortium bore 20% of the cost ($356.4 million) while the remaining 80% ($1.4256 billion) was be financed by a loan from the Industrial and Commercial Bank of China.

Tariff
The Government of Pakistan will purchase electricity from the plant at a tariff of 8.3601 US Cents/kWh.

Is Sahiwal a suitable site for this project? 
Sahiwal is located in the Central Punjab, Pakistan with a very productive agrarian land of extreme fertility. This raises in the minds of people concerned, a critical question related to the site of the project and the possible risks linked with pollution and soil fertility decline.

The answers to such questions might be scientific but easily understandable.

Though thermal poweplants which involve coal as the main burning substance increase the risk factors of pollution but certain precautions can minimize the harmful effects resulting from the thermal procedures. For this purpose, modern electrostatic precipitator and desulphurization technology has been fitted in this project which will take care of the quality of air by eliminating dust particles, ash and sulphur contents from the outgoing flowing gas. An anti seepage ash yard has been built in the system to prevent ash water from entering the ground. Furthermore, the most advanced air quality monitoring system has been fitted in the site to monitor and maintain the air quality of the surroundings. 

The question related to the disturbance in the balance of water supply for agriculture is answered by the logic that only 60,000 cubic metres of water per day from Lower Bari Doab is needed for complete operation of the plant which does not have any impact on the water being used for agrarian purposes of the surrounding agricultural land. 

So, Sahiwal proves to be a very suitable site for Coal Power Plant despite the concerns of some people.  
 

    

 List of power stations in Pakistan

References

Coal-fired power stations in Pakistan
Sahiwal District
Buildings and structures in Punjab, Pakistan
China–Pakistan Economic Corridor
Tourist attractions in Sahiwal
Energy in Punjab, Pakistan